Codoxime (Codossima) is an opiate analogue that is a derivative of hydrocodone, where the 6-ketone group has been replaced by carboxymethyloxime. It has primarily antitussive effects and was found to have moderate potential to cause dependence in animal studies.

References

Antitussives
4,5-Epoxymorphinans
Catechol ethers
Mu-opioid receptor agonists
Semisynthetic opioids